These are the results of the 2017 Asian Wrestling Championships which took place between 10 May and 14 May 2017 in New Delhi, India.

Men's freestyle

57 kg
13 May

61 kg
14 May

65 kg
13 May

70 kg
14 May

74 kg
13 May

86 kg
14 May

97 kg
13 May

125 kg
14 May

Men's Greco-Roman

59 kg
11 May

66 kg
10 May

71 kg
11 May

75 kg
10 May

80 kg
10 May

85 kg
11 May

98 kg
10 May

130 kg
10 May

Women's freestyle

48 kg
12 May

53 kg
12 May

55 kg
12 May

58 kg
13 May

60 kg
12 May

63 kg
11 May

69 kg
12 May

75 kg
11 May

References

Sources

External links
Official website

2017 Results